Mad for Garlic is an Italian restaurant chain based in South Korea owned by MFG Korea. As of 2015, the chain had over 39 retail stores in South Korea and one retail store in Indonesia and Singapore.

See also 

 List of Italian restaurants

References

External links
 

South Korean brands
Restaurant chains in South Korea
Italian restaurants